Morten Halle (born 7 October 1957) is a Norwegian jazz musician (saxophone), composer and music arranger.  He was born in Oslo, and he is known from the city's jazz scene and from a series recordings.

Career
Halle participated in various small bands at the Oslo Jazz scene in the late 1970s, when he studied music at the University of Oslo 1981–86, he was with the band Cutting Edge, and from 1987 in a quartet with John Eberson (guitar), Bjørn Kjellemyr (bass), and Finn Sletten/Pål Thowsen (drums). He has also played with the big band Oslo 13, with Knut Værnes Band, Jon Balke, Søyr, Chipahua and Geir Holmsen Band. He has been in the lineups of Jazzpunkensemblet, Desafinado, Horns for Hire with Torbjørn Sunde and Jens Petter Antonsen,
Jon Balke's Magnetic North Orchestra, Geir Lysne Listening Ensemble, Søyr and Metropolitan (band). He has also appeared on releases by Helge Iberg (1997), Jan Magne Førde (1998), Jan Eggum (1999), Marianne Antonsen (2000) og Jørun Bøgeberg (2006).

Halle has written music for film, theater and ballet, as well as commissioned work only short stay Dølajazz Festival 1992, and composed music to the lyrics of Jesper Halle, performed by Jonas Fjeld and Sidsel Endresen (1988). He is a prominent figure in modern Norwegian jazz. His album releases include Alle tre (1995, compilation album Cutting Edge), 2 (1991) and The Eagle (1995), with Halle/Eberson Quartett.

Lately he leads his own trio with Anders Jormin and Svante Henryson, and the Morten Halle Qvartet''' with Edvard Askeland, Torstein Lofthus and André Peterson/Vigleik Storaas.

Halle is a partner in the label "Curling Legs" (1992–), is attached as associate professor at Norges Musikkhøgskole in Oslo, and former Chairman of TONO.

 Discography (selection) 

 Solo projects 
With Cutting EdgeCutting Edge (Odin Records, 1982)Our Man In Paradise (Odin Records, 1984)Duesenberg (Curling Legs, 1986)Alle tre (Curling Legs, 1995), compilation

Wirh Halle/Eberson Quartet
 Blow! (Odin Records, 1989)
 2 (Curling Legs, 1992)
 The Eagle (Curling Legs, 1995)

With Anders Jormin and Svante HenrysonTen Easy Pieces (Curling Legs, 2005)

With "Halles komet"Halles komet (Curling Legs, 2007)

 Collaborations 
With Marit MathiesenMed parfyme (1981)Gale hjerte (1984)

With Sverre KjelsbergSverre (1982)

With Ketil StokkanEkte mannfolk (1985)Romeo (1986)

With Øystein SundeOverbuljongpakkemesterassistent/Kaptein Snutebil (1986)Kjekt å ha (1989)Øystein Sundes 40 beste (1990)Du må'kke komme her og komme her (1994)Sundes verden – 52 av de aller beste (2006)

With Oslo 13 (Jon Balke)Nonsentration (1992)Oslo 13 Live (1993)Live In the North (2001)

With Ole Edvard AntonsenTour De Force (1992)Read My Lips (1997)

With Jon Balke and Magnetic North OrchestraFurther (1994)Solarized (1999)Kyanos (2002)

With Jan EggumDeilig (1999)Ekte Eggum (2001)30/30 (2005)

With othersLarsen (1982), with Kjell LarsenUng Pike Forsvunnet (1982), with Ung Pike ForsvunnetThe Soul Survivors (1984), with ChipahuaYou and I/It's a Game (1984), with RuthEn herre med bart (1985), with Eldar VåganTo feite striper Brylkrem (1987), with The TeddybearsEtterlatte sanger (1988), with Jonas FjeldFisking i Valdres (1988), with Viggo SandvikKvinner & Kanari (1989), with André DanielsenWake Me When the Moon Comes Up (1989), with Duck SpinTempo (1989), with Vazelina BilopphøggersLast Train Home (1990), with Reidar LarsenTatt av vinden (1990), with Bjørn EidsvågDecember (1990), with Dag KolsrudImages of Light (1990), with Erik WølloTamme erter og villbringebær (1990), with Maj Britt AndersenTa meg til havet (1992), with Hanne KroghAutumn 92 (1992), with Petter SamuelsenRoneo (1993), with Knut Værnes BandShaken - Not Stirred (1993), with Palisander KvartettenMed lyset på (1994), with Norsk UtfluktDu følger vinden (1994), with Diamond SimoneSong om ei segn (1994), with LoMskBussene lengter hjem (1994), with SøyrDeceivers & Believers (1994), with Tim Scott McConnellRippel Rappel (1994), with Maj Britt AndersenExile (1994), with Sidsel EndresenThe Water Is Wide (1994), with EriksenNightsong (1995), with Sidsel Endresen and Bugge WesseltoftHar du lyttet til elvene om natta? (1995), with Sinikka LangelandTverr Geitt tolker Geirr Tveitt live (1995), with Tverr GeittVoices (1996), with KvitrettenLife Is Good (1996), with Steinar AlbrigtsenThirteen Rounds (1997), with Jon Ebersons JazzpunkensembleNever Ending "West Side" Story (1997), with Helge IbergMed kjøtt og kjærlighet (1997), with Eidbjørg Raknes16 utvalgte sanger (1997), with Arne AanoNoahs draum (1998), with Kjell HabbestadSalmist (1998), with Per SøetorpRotor (1998), with Jon Balke/Cikada StrykekvartettImagic (1998), with Niels PræstholmDomen (1998), with Jan Magne FørdeMeridians (1998), with Torbjørn SundeFlua på veggen (1998), with VampMetropolitan (1999), with MetropolitanSolarized (1999), with Jon BalkeSoulful Christmas Songs (2000), with Marianne AntonsenThe 00 Quartet (2001), with The 00 QuartetSirkus Mikkelikski (2001), with Alf PrøysenAlene hjemme (2001), with SøyrIndigo (2001), with New Jordal SwingersAurora Borealis - Northern Lights (2002), with Geir LysneBelfast Cowboy (2002), with New Jordal SwingersKelner! (2002), with Odd Børretzen/Lars Martin MyhreSongs After You (2003), with Runar Andersen/Janne KjellsenA Night in Cassis (2004), with  Knut Værnes and VertavokvartettenSilver (2004), with Solveig Slettahjell and Slow Motion QuintetGo Get Some (2004), with Tys TysTida som går (2004), with Norsk UtfluktLove Is Blind (2004), with MetropolitanPixiedust (2005), with Solveig Slettahjell and Slow Motion OrchestraBoahjenásti - The North Star (2006), with Geir Lysne Listening EnsembleBasstard (2006), with Jørun BøgebergByggmester Solness (2006), to the play by Henrik IbsenFemkant (2007), with PustCasta la vista! - Nissa og Elisabeths favorittsanger (2008), with Nissa Nyberget and Elisabeth LindlandThe Grieg Code (2009), with Geir Lysne EnsembleGjenfortellinger (2009), with PitsjTake a Look at Your Life (2010), with Petter SamuelsenBig Shit'' (2010), with T8

References

External links

Morten Halle Biography - SNL.no Store Norske Leksikon
Halle, Morten Biography - Norsk Musikkinformasjon MIC.no

Norwegian jazz saxophonists
Norwegian jazz composers
Male jazz composers
University of Oslo alumni
Academic staff of the Norwegian Academy of Music
ECM Records artists
1957 births
Living people
Musicians from Oslo
21st-century saxophonists
21st-century Norwegian male musicians
1300 Oslo members
Cutting Edge (band) members
Søyr members
Geir Lysne Listening Ensemble members
Jazzpunkensemblet members